June 2020

See also

References

killings by law enforcement officers
 06